Ravensthorpe is a village and civil parish in West Northamptonshire in England. The village lies approximately midway between Northampton and Rugby. The M1 motorway is six miles west and the nearest railway station is at Long Buckby. At the time of the 2001 census, the parish's population was 656 people, including Coton but falling slightly to 646 at the 2011 census.

The village's name means 'outlying farm/settlement of Hrafn'.
Services within the village include a shop, the 'Chequers' pub, a playing field, a small park and a woodland maintained by the Woodland Trust.

History
Iron Age and Roman pottery have been found around the village, indicating a possible settlement. By the time of the Domesday Survey, a settlement of either Anglo-Saxon or Scandinavian origin was recorded.

The St Denys Church was built in the 13th Century on a site believed to have been in use since the time of William the Conqueror.

Mother Rhodes, who lived just outside the village, was alleged to be a witch during the Northamptonshire Witch Trials. During the trial, testimonies against Joan Vaughn and Agnes Brown alleged that they were seen with other ‘witches’, Katherine Gardiner and Joan Lucus, visiting Mother Rhodes, who was found dying according to The Witches of Northamptonshire: "It was credthly reported that some fort-night before their apprehension, this Agnes Browne, one Ratherine Gardiner, and one Ioane Lucas, all birds of a winge, and all abyding in the Towne of Gilsborough did ride one night to a place (not aboue a mile off) called Rauenstrop, all vpon a Sowes backe, to sée one mother Rhoades, an old Witch that dwelt there, but before they came to her house the old Witch died, and in her last cast cried out, that there were three of her old friends coming to sée her, but they came too late, Howbeit shee would méete with them in another place within a month after. And thus much con∣cerning Agnes Browne, and her daughter". Vaughn and Brown were executed on 22 July 1612.

Geography
The civil parish of Ravensthorpe includes nearby Coton. Nearby tourist attractions include Coton Manor Garden, Althorp House, and Holdenby House.

In popular culture
A village of the same name is present in the 2020 video game Assassin's Creed Valhalla, although the fictionalised Ravensthorpe is in a different location. According to the game's narrative director, Darby McDevitt, the fictional version was created without knowledge of the real location, and a Reddit user made the connection on 13 November. McDevitt claimed the development team only found out about the similarity a few months prior. Lord of the Manor Charlie Reeve declared a week-long commemorative event for the release of an in-game Yuletide festival, coinciding with local pub The Chequers releasing a special takeaway menu.

References

External links

Village website
Parish council details

Villages in Northamptonshire
West Northamptonshire District
Civil parishes in Northamptonshire